The Gamblers may refer to:

Film
 The Gamblers (1919 film), a 1919 American drama film directed by Paul Scardon
 The Gamblers (1929 film), a 1929 American drama film directed by Michael Curtiz
 The Gamblers (1950 film), a 1950 French film based on the play by Nikolai Gogol
 The Gamblers (1970 film), a 1970 American film directed by Ron Winston and based on Dostoevsky's 1867 novel The Gambler

Music
The Gamblers (Shostakovich), or Igroki, an unfinished opera by Dmitri Shostakovich
The Gamblers (British band), primarily backing band of Billy Fury on Decca then Parlophone
The Gamblers (surf band), an American surf rock band
Guitar Ray & The Gamblers, Italian blues band founded in 2002

Other
 The Gamblers (play), an 1840 play by Nikolai Gogol
 Houston Gamblers, US Football League team

See also
The Gambler (disambiguation)